Benjamin (original title: Benjamin ou les Mémoires d'un puceau; U.S title: The Diary of an Innocent Boy) is a 1968 French comedy film directed by Michel Deville who co-wrote the screenplay with Nina Companéez.

Plot
In the eighteenth century, seventeen-year-old virgin Benjamin comes with his old servant to stay at the estate of his aunt, Countess de Valandry, who is having an affair with Count Philippe. Benjamin is pursued by various women, including the beautiful Anne, who really loves Philippe.

Cast
Michèle Morgan as Countess de Valandry.
Catherine Deneuve as Anne
Pierre Clémenti as Benjamin
Michel Piccoli as Count Philippe
Francine Bergé as Marion
Anna Gaël as Célestine
Catherine Rouvel as Victorine
Jacques Dufilho as Camille
Odile Versois as Married woman

Production
Filming began in June 1967. The day before filming began, Catherine Deneuve's sister and fellow actress Françoise Dorléac had died in a car accident.

"It was a painful time in my life", she later recalled. "I was in a cloud. I turned a bit like a misty automaton. Fortunately, the grief did not mark the film."

"Benjamin was a role that I really liked," said Deneuve later. "It was a comedy, but in the spirit and tone particular."

Reception

Box office
The film was the eleventh most popular movie at the French box office in 1968.

Critical response
The critic for The Guardian claimed that "the dialogue is stylish without being witty and it is continuously and tiresomely arch." The Los Angeles Times said the film was "as superlatively acted as it is photographed and scored". The Washington Post said the film "has little to be said for it except is evidently authentic chateux".

Pauline Kael wrote that Pierre Clementi "indicates adolescent innocence by being loose-limbed and girlish. It is essential for the boy to suggest the kind of man he will become once he has learned what everyone is so eager to teach him, but Clémenti looks as though he would become a lesbian."

References

External links

Review of film at The New York Times
Review of film by Roger Ebert

1968 films
1960s historical comedy films
1968 romantic comedy films
Films about virginity
Films set in country houses
Films set in the 18th century
French coming-of-age comedy films
French historical comedy films
1960s French-language films
French romantic comedy films
Louis Delluc Prize winners
Romantic period films
Films directed by Michel Deville
1960s historical romance films
1960s French films
1960s coming-of-age comedy films